Sherwood is a city in Washington County, Oregon, United States. Located in the southeast corner of the county, it is a residential community in the Tualatin Valley, southwest of Portland. As of the 2010 census, Sherwood had a population of 18,194 residents. The city's population for 2019 was estimated to be 19,879 by the U.S. Census. Sherwood was first incorporated in 1893 as a town. Originally named Smockville after its founder, James Christopher Smock, the town was given its current name by local businessman Robert Alexander in 1891. The name "Sherwood" may have come from Sherwood, Michigan or the Sherwood Forest in England.

History

What is now the Sherwood area was originally inhabited by the Atfalati band of the Kalapuya nation. Native Americans were relocated to reservations after the Donation Land Claim Act of 1850–55 gave American citizens exclusive ownership of these lands. The relocation process took place under the guidance of a series of federal employees, most notably Superintendent of Indian Affairs Joel Palmer, who was removed from office after being criticized for being too lenient with Indian policy.

The California Gold Rush of 1849 caused a dramatic shift in the area's economy. Oregon City, Oregon is along a stretch of the Willamette River that had always been attractive to trade since prehistoric times, when trading activity was dominated by the Chinookan tribe.

The name "Sherwood" came either after Sherwood Forest in England or Sherwood, Michigan In 1885, the Smocks gave a right-of-way on their property to the Portland and Willamette Valley Railway. The Smocks platted the town in 1889, the same year rail service began. Tradition has it that no one, not even the town's founders, liked the name "Smock Ville," and so a public meeting was held to rename the town.  Robert Alexander, who was both a local resident and prominent businessman, suggested the name "Sherwood." According to post office records, Alexander was from Sherwood, Michigan, and also said the forest which surrounded the city was like Sherwood Forest in England. The U.S. Postal Department began sending mail to the Town of Sherwood, Oregon, on July 5, 1891. Smock was the first postmaster. The Town of Sherwood was incorporated under Oregon Senate Bill 36 in 1893.

The main industry in the 1890s was a pressed brick yard which closed in 1896, a victim of the deep recession of 1893.  The Klondike Gold Rush of 1897 revived Sherwood's economy.  In 2014, Money ranked Sherwood fifth among the top fifty best places to live in the United States. In August 2009, Family Circle named the city one of America's most "family friendly" small towns.

The population of the city in 1911 was 350 within a  city limit.

Geography

Demographics

2010 census
As of the census of 2010, there were 18,194 people, 6,316 households, and 4,857 families living in the city. The racial makeup of the city was 88.5% White, 0.8% African American, 0.5% Native American, 3.5% Asian, 0.3% Pacific Islander, 2.7% from other races, and 3.7% from two or more races. Hispanic or Latino of any race were 7.0% of the population.

There were 6,316 households, of which 49.6% had children under the age of 18 living with them, 63.5% were married couples living together, 9.7% had a female householder with no husband present, 3.6% had a male householder with no wife present, and 23.1% were non-families. 19.0% of all households were made up of individuals, and 6.7% had someone living alone who was 65 years of age or older. The average household size was 2.88 and the average family size was 3.31.

The median age in the city was 34.3 years. 33.6% of residents were under the age of 18; 5% were between the ages of 18 and 24; 32.9% were from 25 to 44; 21.6% were from 45 to 64; and 6.8% were 65 years of age or older. The gender makeup of the city was 48.9% male and 51.1% female.

The median income for a household in the city was $82,579, and the median income for a family was $90,492. Males had a median income of $66,052 versus $47,013 for females. The per capita income for the city was $31,047. About 2.2% of families and 4.1% of the population were below the poverty line, including 3.8% of those under age 18 and 1.0% of those age 65 or over.

2000 census
As of the 2000 census, there were 11,791 people, 4,253 households, and 3,300 families living in the city. The population density was 2,895.5 people per square mile (1,118.6/km). There were 4,412 housing units at an average density of 1,083.4 per square mile (418.5/km). The racial makeup of the city was 92.36% White, 0.43% African American, 0.51% Native American, 2.22% Asian, 0.04% Pacific Islander, 1.76% from other races, and 2.67% from two or more ethnicity. Hispanic or Latino of any ethnicity were 4.72% of the population.

There were 4,253 households, out of which 46.3% had children under the age of 18 living with them, 65.7% were married couples living together, 8.8% had a female householder with no husband present, and 22.4% were non-families. 17.0% of all households were made up of individuals, and 5.4% had someone living alone who was 65 years of age or older. The average household size was 2.77 and the average family size was 3.14.

In the city, the population was spread out, with 31.7% under the age of 18, 5.5% from 18 to 24, 41.2% from 25 to 44, 16.4% from 45 to 64, and 5.3% who were 65 years of age or older. The median age was 31 years. For every 100 females, there were 95.4 males. For every 100 females age 18 and over, there were 92.9 males.

The median income for a household in the city was $62,518, and the median income for a family was $67,277. Males had a median income of $47,920 versus $33,657 for females. The per capita income for the city was $25,793. About 1.5% of families and 2.7% of the population were below the poverty line, including 2.0% of those under age 18 and 11.7% of those age 65 or over.

Infrastructure and services
Sherwood is within the Tri-County Metropolitan Transportation District of Oregon (TriMet), the Portland metropolitan area's primary transit agency.  TriMet bus lines 93, 94 and 97 provide service to Sherwood; line 94 is an express route running through to downtown Portland.  Additionally, the Yamhill County Transit Area's routes 44, 45x and 46s connect Sherwood with Newberg, McMinnville, and other points in Yamhill County, which are outside the boundaries of the TriMet district.

Fire protection and emergency medical services are provided through Tualatin Valley Fire and Rescue.

Schools

Sherwood has four elementary schools (Hawks View, Middleton, Archer Glen, Ridges), one middle school, Sherwood Middle School, and one high school, Sherwood High School, in the Sherwood School District. As of the 2017–2018 school year, there were between 500 and 600 students attending each of the four elementary schools, 490 students at Laurel Ridge Middle School, 686 at Sherwood Middle School, and 1,712 students enrolled at Sherwood High School.

Notable people
Del Baker, (1892–1973) was a professional baseball player, coach, and manager with the Detroit Tigers.
Jim Benning, (b 1963) is a former Canadian professional ice hockey executive and former player. 
Dave Edstrom, (1938–2019) was a decathlete, He won the gold medal in the men's decathlon event at the 1959 Pan American Games in Chicago
Rich Fellers (born 1959), Olympic equestrian
A.C. Gibbs, (1825–1886) was an American politician and the second Governor of Oregon
Iain Harrison,  is a competitive shooter and former British Army Captain
Glenn Olds, (1921–2006) was an academic administrator, government official and politician. 
Jiggs Parrott, (1871–1898) was a professional baseball player
Thomas H. Parrott, (1836–1899) was an English musician.
Tom Parrott,(1868–1932), was a professional baseball player. 
Ilsa Paulson, (b 1988)  former professional long-distance runner and winner of the 2009 USA Marathon Championships
Bud Podbielan, (1924–1982) was a professional baseball player for the Cincinnati Reds.
Adley Rutschman, (b 1998) is a professional baseball catcher for the Baltimore Orioles.
Mark Smith, fantasy gamebook author
Daniela Solís, (b 1993) is a Mexican-American footballer.
Chuck Sun, (b 1956) is a former professional motocross racer.
Ashton Eaton

See also
 Sherwood Public Library
 Tualatin River National Wildlife Refuge
 Tualatin Valley Fire and Rescue

References

External links

 Listing for Sherwood in the Oregon Blue Book

 
1889 establishments in Oregon
Populated places established in 1889
Cities in Oregon
Cities in Washington County, Oregon
Portland metropolitan area